The Koursibo is a 135 km long river in French Guiana. It rises in the centre of the country, flowing north until it reaches the river Sinnamary. Its eventual outflow is into the Atlantic Ocean.

References

Rivers of French Guiana
Rivers of France